Gerald William Bean is a Canadian former actor who had television and film roles under the names Gerry Bean and John Oliver.

Career 
Bean is best known for his role as Royal Canadian Mounted Police officer Eric Olssen in the first two seasons of North of 60, for which he received a Gemini Award nomination for Best Actor in a Continuing Leading Dramatic Role at the 8th Gemini Awards in 1994.

In 1994, Bean was charged with assault after an off-set altercation with Tina Keeper, his North of 60 costar and former common-law wife. A few months later he was dropped from the series, although the producers denied that the decision was related to the assault case. Keeper later withdrew the assault charge.

Bean also had guest roles in 21 Jump Street, The Beachcombers, Danger Bay, Broken Badges, Bordertown and MacGyver as Gerry Bean, and The Mighty Ducks, Murder, She Wrote and The X-Files as John Oliver.

Filmography

Film

Television

References

External links

Canadian male film actors
Canadian male stage actors
Canadian male television actors
Living people
Year of birth missing (living people)